Milparinka is a small settlement in north-west New South Wales, Australia, about  north of Broken Hill on the Silver City Highway. At the time of the 2016 census, Milparinka had a population of 77 people. Milparinka is on Evelyn Creek.

Summer temperatures can reach .

History
In 1844, Charles Sturt's expedition was stranded for six months at nearby Preservation Creek, owing to a lack of supplies.

Gold was discovered in the 1870s and a rush commenced in 1880. The mostly-male population peaked at 3,000, with W.H.J. Slee being appointed the resident Goldfields Warden in January 1881. Cobb & Co coaches ran three times a week from Milparinka to Wilcannia on the Darling River (the closest settlement, as Broken Hill did not yet exist) and by August 1881 the official gold escort had carried about 10,000 ounces of gold from the field, not to mention that which went privately.  

In this arid region, water was so scarce that miners collected their gold by dry blowing. Water was selling for one shilling per bucket and dysentery was rife, until in September 1881, on the recommendation of W.H.J. Slee, the New South Wales government authorised the drilling of a well. In December 1881, the government well struck water at 140 feet, which caused great relief to all.

At its height, Milparinka had a newspaper, a police office, a chemist shop, two butchers, a courthouse (1886), a school (1883), a hospital (1889) and four hotels.
There was drought in 1884.

In June 1902, a large meteorite landed at nearby Mt Brown.

Heritage listings 
The ruins of the Albert Goldfield are listed on the New South Wales State Heritage Register.

Notes and references

External links
  for more information about Milparinka and the district

 
Mining towns in New South Wales
Parishes of Evelyn County
Unincorporated Far West Region